Edward Mitchell may refer to:

Edward Page Mitchell (1852–1927), American writer
Edward Mitchell (Irish politician) (1852–1921), Member of Parliament for North Fermanagh, 1903–1906
Edward Fancourt Mitchell (1855–1941), Australian lawyer
Edward Mitchell (Scottish politician) (1879–1965), British Member of Parliament for Paisley, 1924–1929
Edward Mitchell (pianist) (1891–1950), British pianist and composer known for his interpretations of Russian music
Edward Mitchell (footballer) (1892–1916), English footballer
 Edward Mitchell (New York politician) (1842–1909), American lawyer and politician from New York
Ed Mitchell (rower) (1901–1970), American rower
E. A. Mitchell (Edward Archibald Mitchell, 1910–1979), U.S. Representative from Indiana, military leader and businessman
Ed Mitchell (Edward Frederick Mitchell, born 1953), British former television presenter and news reader

See also
Eddy Mitchell (born 1942), French singer and actor
Ted Mitchell (disambiguation)